Fort Lisa is the name of two locations significant to fur trading in the Midwestern United States:

 Fort Lisa (Nebraska)
 Fort Lisa (North Dakota)